Dieida judith is a species of moth of the family Cossidae. It is found in Jordan and Israel, where it is known from the northern Negev.

Adults have been recorded on wing in March in Israel.

References

Moths described in 2008
Cossinae
Moths of the Middle East